Doktor und Apotheker (Doctor and Apothecary) is a German-language two-act singspiel by Carl Ditters von Dittersdorf, with a libretto by Johann Gottlieb Stephanie the Younger, based on the anonymous French comedy L'apothicaire de Murcie (The Apothecary of Murcie). It is considered the composer's masterpiece and premiered on 11 July 1786 at the k. u. k. National-Theater in Vienna

Plot

Act 1

Act 2

Cast
 Stößel, an apothecary (bass)
 Claudia, his wife (soprano)
 Leonore, their daughter (soprano)
 Rosalie, Stößel's niece (soprano)
 Doctor Krautmann (bass)
 Gotthold, his son (tenor)
 Sturmwald, a captain invalided out of the army (tenor)
 Sichel, surgeon (tenor)
 Police Commissioner (bass)
 Gallus, a patient's servant (tenor)
 Marx, apprentice apothecary (non-speaking and non-singing role)

Music

Bibliography 
Stuttgart, Universal-Bibliothek Nr. 4090 (1961)

External links
 
 Libretto
 http://www.oper-um-1800.uni-mainz.de/einzeldarstellung_werk.php?id_werke=1716
 http://www.operone.de/opern/doktorundaop.html 
 Der Apotheker und Doktor : eine deutsche komische Opera im Clavier-Auszug. – Bonn : N. Simrock, (s. a.). Digitalisierte Ausgabe der Universitäts- und Landesbibliothek Düsseldorf

German-language operas
Singspiele
Operas
1786 operas